Gresild Lika (born 2 November 1997) is an Albanian footballer who plays as a midfielder for FK Partizani in the Kategoria Superiore.

Career

Luftëtari
In the summer of 2019, Lika signed for Albanian Superliga club Luftëtari. He made his league debut for the club on 24 August 2019, playing the entirety of a 3–0 away defeat to KF Tirana.

Partizani
In the summer of 2021, Lika signed for the Albanian Superliga club  FK Partizani.

References

External links
Gresild Lika at Eurosport

1997 births
Living people
FK Dinamo Tirana players
KF Korabi Peshkopi players
Luftëtari Gjirokastër players
Kategoria Superiore players
Kategoria e Parë players
Association football midfielders
Footballers from Tirana
Albanian footballers